Psycho One Hundred is the debut album by the Dutch death metal band Nembrionic. It was released in 1995 by Displeased Records. The track listing printed on the CD is incorrect.

Track listing
  "Kill Them"  (0:51)
  "Coffin on Coffin"  (3:16)
  "Strength through Hate"  (1:44)
  "Strength through Pain"  (2:49)
  "Warzone"  (1:35)
  "Modo Grosso"  (2:36)
  "Death to the Harmless"  (5:20)
  "15 Minutes"  (1:44)
  "In Ebony"  (3:14)
  "Strength through Power"  (3:21)
  "Psycho One Hundred: Development"  (4:36)
  "Psycho One Hundred: Morning"  (5:16)
  "Psycho One Hundred: Ceremony"  (6:12)
  "Psycho One Hundred: Evening"  (4:46)
  "Bulldözer"  (2:49)

Credits
 Jamil Berud - Bass
 Dennis Jak - Guitar
 Noel Derek Rule Van Eersel - Drums
 Marco ("Bor") Westenbrink - Guitar, vocals
 Edwin Kelder - guest vocals on "Bulldözer"

1993 albums
Nembrionic albums